The black-billed shrike-tyrant (Agriornis montanus) is a species of bird in the family Tyrannidae.  It is found in Argentina, Bolivia, Chile, Colombia, Ecuador, Peru, and is a vagrant to the Falkland Islands.  It is a large flycatcher at 23–25 cm (9–10 in) long. Its natural habitats are subtropical or tropical high-altitude shrubland, subtropical or tropical high-altitude grassland, and pastureland.

Gallery

References

black-billed shrike-tyrant
Birds of the Andes
Birds of Patagonia
black-billed shrike-tyrant
Taxonomy articles created by Polbot
Taxa named by Frédéric de Lafresnaye
Taxa named by Alcide d'Orbigny